Michael Fitchett may refer to:

 Michael Fitchett (Australian sportsman) (1927–2021), Australian former professional cricketer and Australian rules football player
 Michael Fitchett (basketball) (born 1982), New Zealand former professional basketball player